The 2021 Detroit mayoral election occurred on November 2, 2021.

The Mayor of Detroit is elected on a non-partisan basis, where the candidates are not listed by political party. A non-partisan primary election was held on August 3, 2021. The top two finishers (incumbent mayor Mike Duggan and former deputy mayor Anthony Adams) advanced to the general election on November 2, 2021. Duggan won re-election with a decisive 75.6% of the vote.

Candidates

Declared
Anthony Adams, former deputy mayor of Kwame Kilpatrick and former president of the Detroit school board
Tom Barrow, businessman and candidate for Mayor of Detroit in 1985, 1989, 2009 and 2013
Kiawana Brown
Mike Duggan, incumbent mayor
Myya Jones, write-in candidate for Mayor of Detroit in 2017
Jasahn Larsosa
Charleta McInnis
Danetta Simpson, candidate for Mayor of Detroit in 2017
Arthur Tyus
D. Etta Wilcoxon
Cheryl Webb

Withdrawn or disqualified
Articia Bomer, candidate for Mayor of Detroit in 2017
Curtis Greene, author and candidate for Mayor of Detroit in 2017
Emanuel Shaw

Declined
Sherry Gay-Dagnogo, state representative
Sharon McPhail, former city councillor, former general counsel to former mayor Kwame Kilpatrick, and candidate for mayor in 1993 and 2005
Shri Thanedar, state representative and candidate for governor in 2018

Primary

Endorsements

Polling

Result

Primary

General

Notes

References

External links
Official campaign websites
 Anthony Adams (D) for Mayor
 Tom Barrow for Mayor
 Mike Duggan (D) for Mayor
 Myya Jones (D) for Mayor 
 Cheryl Webb for Mayor 

Mayoral elections in Detroit
Detroit
Detroit
2020s in Detroit